Vladimir Semyonovich Kuzin (July 15, 1930 – October 5, 2007) was a former Soviet cross-country skier who competed during the 1950s, training at Dynamo in Leningrad. Born in Lampozhnya, Arkhangelsk Oblast, he earned a gold medal in the 4 x 10 km relay at the 1956 Winter Olympics in Cortina d'Ampezzo. He also finished 5th in the 30 km event in those same Olympics.

Kuzin's best successes were at the 1954 FIS Nordic World Ski Championships in Falun, where he earned two golds (30 km, 50 km) and one silver medal (4 x 10 km relay).

In 1957 he was awarded Order of Lenin. He defended a dissertation for the Candidate of Biological Science degree.

References
 
 
Sport Gazeta announcement of Kuzin's death 

1930 births
2007 deaths
People from Arkhangelsk Oblast
Cross-country skiers at the 1956 Winter Olympics
Dynamo sports society athletes
Olympic cross-country skiers of the Soviet Union
Olympic gold medalists for the Soviet Union
Soviet male cross-country skiers
Olympic medalists in cross-country skiing
FIS Nordic World Ski Championships medalists in cross-country skiing
Medalists at the 1956 Winter Olympics
Sportspeople from Arkhangelsk Oblast